The mina (also mĕnē, Aramaic) is an ancient Near Eastern unit of weight, roughly equivalent to a pound, which was divided into 60 shekels. The mina, like the shekel, was also a unit of currency.

History

Sumerian
From earliest Sumerian times, a mina was a unit of weight. At first, talents and shekels had not yet been introduced. By the time of Ur-Nammu (shortly before 2000 BCE), the mina had a value of  talent as well as 60 shekels.

Semitic languages
It is mentioned in the Bible, where Solomon is reported to have made 300 shields, each with 3 "mina" of gold, or later after the Edict of Cyrus II of Persia the people are reported to have donated 5000 minas of silver for the reconstruction of Solomon's Temple in Jerusalem.

In the Biblical story of Belshazzar's feast, the words mene, mene, tekel, upharsin appear on the wall (Daniel 5:25), which according to one interpretation can mean "mina, mina, shekel, and half-pieces", although Daniel interprets the words differently for King Belshazzar.

Writings from Ugarit give the value of a mina as equivalent to fifty shekels. The prophet Ezekiel refers to a mina (maneh in the King James Version) also as 60 shekels, in the Book of Ezekiel 45:12. Jesus of Nazareth tells the "parable of the minas" in Luke 19:11–27, also told as the "parable of the talents" in Matthew 25:14–30.

From the Akkadian period, 2 mina was equal to 1  of water (cf. clepsydra, water clock).

Greek
It originally equalled 70 drachmae but later, at the time of the statesman Solon (c. 594 BC), was increased to 100 drachmae. The Greek word  was borrowed from Semitic. Different city states used minae of different weights. In Solon's day, according to Plutarch, the price of a sheep was one drachma or a medimnos (about 40kg) of wheat. Thus a mina was worth 100 sheep.

Latin
The word  also occurs in Latin literature, but mainly in plays of Plautus and Terence adapted from Greek originals. In Terence's play Heauton Timorumenos, adapted from a play of the same name by the Greek playwright Menander, a certain sum of money is referred to in one place as "ten minae" (line 724) and in another as "1000 drachmas of silver" (line 601). Usually the word  referred to a mina of silver, but Plautus also twice mentions a mina of gold. In the 4th century BC, gold was worth about 10 times the same weight of silver. In Plautus, 20 minae is mentioned as the price of buying a slave. It was also the price of hiring a courtesan for a year. 40 minae is given as the price of a house.

With a weight of only , however, the Roman  was lighter than either a Greek mina or a modern pound of 16 ounces. It was divided into 12 Roman ounces. Sometimes the word  was used together with the word  "in weight", e.g. "a pound in weight" (Livy, 3.29); but often  was used alone; e.g. "five (pounds) in weight of gold" (Cicero, pro Cluentio 179). Hence the word  by itself came to mean "pound(s)". From Latin  comes the English word "pound", and from  come the abbreviations "lb" (for weight) and the pound sign "£" (for money).

Images

Notes

References

Bibliography

Units of mass
Ancient Near East
Coins of ancient Greece